HD 219617 is a binary star system some 220 light-years away from the Solar System in the constellation Aquarius. It is composed of two metal-poor F-type subdwarf stars orbiting each other in a 388-year orbit. Another theory suggests that the binary star is composed of subgiant stars. Unlike many halo stars, which exhibit an excess of alpha elements relative to iron, HD 219617 is depleted in iron peak and alpha elements, although alpha elements concentrations are poorly constrained. The stellar chemical composition is peculiar, being relatively oxygen-enriched and extremely depleted in neutron capture elements. The helium fraction of the binary star at present cannot be reliably determined, and appears to be near the primordial helium abundance.

The binary star HD 219617 is part of the hierarchical triple system LDS 6393, together with the red subdwarf VB 12 (LHS 541) of spectral class sdM3 at a projected separation of 19″ (1,200 AU). VB 12 also has several peculiarities. The star system belongs kinematically to the halo stars. Additional stellar components of the star system are suspected.

The binary nature of HD 219617 has been known since the 19th century, but uncertainties in measurement and a stellar conjunction in 1920 precluded determining even an approximate orbit until 1991. Then in 2017, the orbit was measured accurately, as separation between the stars increased.

References

Aquarius (constellation)
F-type subdwarfs
Binary stars

J23170501-1351046
219617
BD-14 6437
114962